Grandtully (pronounced as "Grantly" and sometimes also spelt "Grantully") is a small village in Perthshire, Scotland.

It has a population of approximately 750 inhabitants.

Parish Church
Grandtully has a Church of Scotland parish church; it is now part of Grantully, Logierait and Strathtay Parish (within the Church of Scotland's Presbytery of Dunkeld and Meigle).

St Mary's church

In Nether Pitcairn, 3.2 km south-west of Grandtully, there is a church built by Alexander Stewart of Grandtully in, or shortly before, 1533.

It is a low and outwardly unassuming white washed building that contains a wooden tunnel vault ceiling with tempera paintings from the early 17th century commissioned by William Stewart. The paintings show scenes and persons from the bible intermixed with the coats of arms of kings and noblemen, and in addition an abundance of birds, fruits and angels, all depicted in a renaissance style with cartouches and imitated metal work. The paintings were restored in about 1950.

Grandtully Castle

Notable people
The Drummond-Stewart baronets
Sir William Drummond Stewart of Grandtully Castle, and his son,
George Stewart, recipient of the Victoria Cross

See also
Ballechin House - a now-demolished supposedly haunted house
Grandtully rapids

References

External links

Grandtully and Strathtay

Villages in Perth and Kinross